Dichelonyx vicina is a species of scarab beetle in the family Scarabaeidae. It is found in North America.

Subspecies
These two subspecies belong to the species Dichelonyx vicina:
 Dichelonyx vicina columbiana Hopping, 1931
 Dichelonyx vicina vicina

References

Further reading

 

Melolonthinae
Articles created by Qbugbot
Beetles described in 1901